Grenville was an electoral riding in Ontario, Canada. In 1867 at the time of confederation, the area was split between Grenville North and Grenville South but these were merged in 1886 into one riding. In 1934, parts of Grenville were merged with the riding of Dundas to form Grenville-Dundas. In 1977 it was further redistributed to form Carleton-Grenville. It was merged into Leeds-Grenville and Stormont-Dundas-Glengarry in 1987.

Members of Provincial Parliament

References

Former provincial electoral districts of Ontario